Kosheen are a British electronic music group based in Bristol, United Kingdom. The group consist of singer-songwriter Sian Evans, songwriter-producer Markee Ledge and producer-songwriter Darren Decoder. The name Kosheen derives from the name of a North American Apache warrior, Cochise. When in Japan, it was discovered that a combination of the Japanese words for "old" (古, romanised transliteration "ko") and "new" (新, "shin") would make "Kosheen" in Japanese.

History

Resist (1999–2002)
Their first album, Resist, was released in September 2001 on Moksha recordings/BMG and reached number eight in the UK album chart.

Kokopelli (2003–2005)
Their second album, Kokopelli—released in August 2003 on Moksha Recordings/Sony and named after a mythical Native American spirit—focused less on drum and bass beats and more on guitar riffs and darker-toned lyrics. It outperformed its predecessor in the UK album chart by reaching number seven, and the single "All In My Head" also reached number seven, but it did not sell as well as its predecessor.

Damage (2007–2008)
Their third album, Damage, was released in Europe via Moksha/Universal Germany in March 2007. The UK edition of Damage, featuring two new tracks—"Analogue Street Dub" and "Professional Friend" (not included on the European edition)—was released via Moksha Recordings in September 2007.

The first single from Damage was "Overkill", released in March (Europe) and August (UK) 2007.

Independence (2012–2013)
In 2010, Kosheen set up their own label, Skeleton, with its first release, "Warning", released on 27 September. On 19 December 2010, they posted the first track, "Belladonna", from Independence, on their Facebook page, along with three more tracks ("Waste", "Enter" and "You Don't Own Me") on their Soundcloud page.

On 25 October 2011, fresh from the success of Sian Evans collaboration with DJ Fresh "Louder" which had reached number 1 in the UK Singles Chart in July, Kosheen confirmed an album release in May 2012, and a single, titled "Get a New One", on 13 February. The second single, "Holding On", features Susie Ledge as the guest vocalist. An announcement was made by the band on their official website that Independence would be released at the end of September 2012. It was released on 1 October 2012. "Mannequin" was later released as the third single from the album. Other songs on the album include "Waste", "Spies", "Addict" and "Tightly".

Solitude (2013–2015)
On 8 November 2013, Kosheen debuted a video for the song "Harder They Fall" as an introduction to their fifth studio album, Solitude. Four days later, the band uploaded the artwork to Solitude along with a release date of 25 November 2013.

Solo projects 
In September 2015, Markee Ledge announced he was releasing a solo album, Elevate, featuring Susie Ledge on the title track.

As of 2017, the members were working on their solo projects.

Discography

Studio albums

Extended plays

Singles

Music videos

References

External links
kosheen.com Moksha Records website
Kosheen.tv, YouTube site for videos and live footage
Kosheen Twitter for Resist, Kokopelli and Damage albums

Musical groups from Bristol
English electronic music groups
Trip hop groups
British drum and bass music groups
British musical trios
Musical groups established in 1999
Musical groups disestablished in 2016
1999 establishments in England